The canton of Avord is an administrative division of the Cher department, in central France. It was created at the French canton reorganisation which came into effect in March 2015. Its seat is in Avord.

It consists of the following communes: 
 
Argenvières 
Avord
Baugy
Beffes
Bengy-sur-Craon
La Chapelle-Montlinard
Charentonnay
Chassy
Chaumoux-Marcilly
Couy
Crosses
Étréchy
Farges-en-Septaine
Garigny
Groises
Gron
Herry
Jussy-Champagne 
Jussy-le-Chaudrier
Lugny-Champagne
Marseilles-lès-Aubigny
Moulins-sur-Yèvre
Nohant-en-Goût
Osmoy
Précy
Saint-Léger-le-Petit
Saint-Martin-des-Champs
Sancergues
Savigny-en-Septaine
Sévry
Villabon
Villequiers
Vornay

References

Cantons of Cher (department)